A coal town, also known as a coal camp or patch, is a type of company town or mining community established by the employer, a mining company, which imports workers to the site to work the mineral find. The company develops it and provides residences for a population of miners and related workers to reside near the coal mine. The 'town founding' process is not limited to mining, but this type of development typically takes place where mineral wealth is located in a remote or undeveloped area. The company opens the site for exploitation by first, constructing transportation infrastructure to serve it, and later to establish residences for workers. Mineral resources were sometimes found as the result of logging operations that established clear-cut area. Geologists and cartographers could then chart and plot the lands for exploitation.

Background
Usually, the coal camp, like the railroad camp and logging camps, began with temporary storage, housing and dining facilities —tents, shanties, shacks— until more permanent dwellings could be built.  Often the first structures to be built were log cabin storehouses, followed by kitchens, a lumber mill and smithies, management offices, and housing. 

Gradually, within a year or so, the camp would be developed as a community with a variety of housing types, including boardinghouses for transients and new hires. Typically the community was organized around a Company Store. The company would often give credit to workers in the form of scrip, a form of token money that would discourage workers from purchasing items in stores outside the town. For the wives and families who joined the miners in such a community, the company store was perhaps "the most essential structure in the town...".

The coal operator would normally divest unprofitable lands as soon as possible, rather than paying land taxes. It recouped some capital by sub-dividing the tract and selling lots and eventually the housing it had built. Structures such as churches and schools were built as the community grew.  The employer might donate funds to aid these, but typically they were financed by residents of the community. 

Given the typically remote locations of mines and the absence of any travel infrastructure serving the mines, 'coal camps' often became a part of being a coal miner.

See also
 Boomtown
 Coal company scrip
 Pit village, a type of coal town in the United Kingdom

References

 
Company towns
Mining communities
Mining culture and traditions
Types of towns